Walter Dorn (born July 11, 1961) is a scientist, educator, author and researcher. Dorn teaches military officers and civilian students at the Canadian Forces College (CFC)  in Toronto and also at the Royal Military College of Canada (RMC) in Kingston. He lectures and leads seminars on  the ethics of armed force, peace operations, the United Nations, arms control, Canadian and US foreign/defence policy, Canadian government and society, and science/technology applications. He serves as chair of the Department of Security and International Affairs at CFC and previously was chair of the Master of Defence Studies programme at RMC.

He has served on the Board of Canadian Pugwash since 1995. From 2008 to 2013, he was chair of the group, which is the Canadian branch of the Pugwash Conferences on Science and World Affairs.

He completed his doctorate in chemistry at the University of Toronto and now applies this scientific background toward the study of peace and conflict issues. He has pursued this work at the Pearson Peacekeeping Centre in Nova Scotia, where he developed and taught courses on technology for peace operations, as well as at Cornell University, where he was a senior research fellow with the Institute for African Development.

Peace Operations

UN Consultation
In 2006, he was commissioned by the UN Department of Peacekeeping Operations (DPKO) to conduct a study on technologies for peacekeeping especially for monitoring of conflicts, borders, sanctions, civilian protection, staff security, and various Security Council mandates. His report was welcomed by the UN Special Committee on Peacekeeping, composed of 124 member states who contribute to peacekeeping. His 2011 book Keeping Watch: Monitoring, Technology and Innovation in UN Peace Operations served as an impetus for the UN's creation of a Panel of Experts on Technology and Innovation in UN Peacekeeping, of which he was a member. DPKO has sought to implement the recommendations in the panel's report titled Performance Peacekeeping.

He also assisted with the negotiation, ratification, and implementation of the 1993 Chemical Weapons Convention (CWC) as the CWC Coordinator for Parliamentarians for Global Action. Since 1983, he has served as the UN Representative of Science for Peace, a Canadian non-governmental organization (NGO). Dorn addressed the United Nations General Assembly in 1988 at the Second UN Special Session on Disarmament.

In 2020 he proposed to the UN a new Occasional Paper series on technology and the first paper in the series was his paper on “Technology Innovation Model for the UN: The “TechNovation Cycle”

Fieldwork

Dorn also has experience in United Nations field missions such as the United Nations Mission in East Timor and the UN mission in the Democratic Republic of the Congo, UNDP projects in Ethiopia, and as a Training Adviser with the UN's Department of Peacekeeping Operations (DPKO). He has been sent by UN Headquarters to the field missions, including MINUSCA in the Central African Republic, MINUSMA in Mali, and MONUC/MONUSC in the D. R. Congo.

Peacekeeping Simulation Project
Dr. Dorn’s knowledge of peacekeeping and career in officer education is being applied to create a UN Peacekeeping Simulation game to train peacekeepers and educate the general public through experiential means. This project is based on detailed studies of actual peace operations.

These scenarios offer immersive, scenario-based learning that reflects the everyday realities of peacekeepers. They help players prepare for and understand the complex social situations in modern conflict zones, including child soldiers and sexual violence.

Academic career
Walter Dorn has taught since 2000 at the Royal Military College of Canada (RMC) and at the Canadian Forces College (CFC) in both official languages using his learner-centric teaching philosophy.

Dorn first came to RMC in 2000 to serve as the organizer (Director) of the International Peacekeeping Summer Institute which offered "critical perspectives on global peace operations." At RMC, he taught the War Studies courses on "International Peacekeeping" in several venues/formats: in person at RMC in Kingston and at National Defence Headquarters (NDHQ) in Ottawa, and by video-teleconference from the CFC in Toronto to students across the country. The course covered a wide range of topics.

At CFC, Dorn has been engaged from his arrival in 2003 in the development of curriculum. He drafted Learning Outcome Guides (LOGs), including guidance (scope, teaching points and readings) for lectures and seminars, and gave feedback to planners on their drafts. He served as the academic adviser for the colonels and equivalents courses, i.e., National Security Studies Course (NSSC).

Dr. Dorn frequently lectures in the Joint Command and Staff Programme (JCSP) at CFC on subjects such as "Just War Tradition and the Ethics of War," "Social Fabric of Canada," "United Nations," and "Peace Support Operations."  He has also taught in JCSP seminars:

 Canadian Defence, Development and Foreign Policy
 Canadian Government and Society
 International Relations Theory
 Global Institutions
 Global Powers
 Strategic Express
 US Foreign and Defence Policies

World Federalist Movement - Canada 
Dr. Walter Dorn joined the World Federalist Movement in the mid-1980s and has been President of the of World Federalist Movement of Canada since 2016. During his time at the organization, he spearheaded projects and events related to global peace and security with an emphasis on UN peacekeeping. He is responsible for chairing the WFM-Canada’s annual meetings and introduced a new code of conduct. He also participates regularly in WFM-Canada’s cosponsored meetings on Canadian peacekeeping.

Selected publications

Books and book chapters

 Air Power in UN Operations: Wings for Peace, 2014.
 Keeping Watch: Monitoring, Technology and Innovation in UN Peace Operations, United Nations Press, 2011 (full pdf).
 UN Peacekeeping Intelligence, chapter in 'Oxford Handbook', Oxford University Press, 2011. (OUP access) (pdf1) (pdf2)
 World Order for a New Millennium: Political, Cultural and Spiritual Approaches to Building Peace, St Martin's Press and MacMillan Press, 1999.

Reports and articles

 The Cuban Missile Crisis Resolved
 Who is Dying for Peace?
 "World Order For a New Millennium: Political, Cultural and Spiritual Approaches to Building Peace." (St. Martin's Press and MacMillan Press, 1999)
 Canadian Peacekeeping: No Myth But Not What It Once Was
 Canada pulls out of peacekeeping
 Afghanistan and UN Peacekeeping - Testimony to the Foreign Affairs Committee
 Intelligence and Peacekeeping: The UN Operation in the Congo 1960-64
 Intelligence and the Operation in Eastern Zaire 1996
 Intelligence-Gathering in UN Peacekeeping: The Limits
 Militias in East Timor: Personal Encounters
 Preventing the Bloodbath: Could the UN have Predicted & Prevented the Rwanda Genocide?
 Unprepared for Peace? Canadian Training for Peacekeeping (pdf) (html) (Fr) (CCPA) (Toronto Star Editorial)

For a more complete set of references see the publications page on Dorn's website.

References

External links
 Walter Dorn's Website
 Peacekeeping Simulation website
 Canadian Forces College (CFC) Profile
 Peace Magazine Profile
 Royal Military College of Canada (RMC) Profile
 National Film Board of Canada, "The Peacekeepers," 2005
 Canadian Pugwash Group

1961 births
Living people
Canadian chemists
People from Toronto
Academic staff of the Royal Military College of Canada
University of Toronto alumni
Canadian officials of the United Nations